Annie Florence Petty (1871 – 1962). was  the first professionally educated and trained librarian to work in the state of North Carolina.  She served as the first librarian at the North Carolina State Normal and Industrial School (now the University of North Carolina at Greensboro) and was one of the founding members of the North Carolina Library Association (a state affiliate of the American Library Association)

Biography 
Annie Petty was born in the Quaker Bush Hill community of Randolph County, North Carolina on August 27, 1871 to William Clinton and Mary Victoria Petty. She attended the Library School of the Drexel Institute of Art, Science and Industry (now Drexel University) in Philadelphia in 1898, where she received her formal training in the emerging field of librarianship.

References 

1962 deaths
1871 births
People from Randolph County, North Carolina
University of North Carolina at Greensboro people
American librarians
American women librarians
Drexel University alumni